The Voice UK is the British version of The Voice of Holland, a television talent series. The series was created by John de Mol and features four coaches looking for a talented new artist, with the intent that a potential auditionee could become a global superstar. The show's concept is simple; the auditionee walks on to the stage with the judges' backs turned to them, rendering looks, personalities, stage presence or dance routines irrelevant, and starts singing. If the judges like what they hear, they will turn around, indicating intent to coach them. If more than one coach turns round, power falls into the hands of the singer. Once all four teams are complete, the live shows begin and the singers sing songs chosen for them by the coaches.

The Voice UK has been referred to as a "big, exciting and warm-hearted series" and a "new generation in its genre" by The Guardian. The show ran on BBC One from 2012 to 2016, and is currently running on ITV Network. The current coaches are will.i.am, Sir Tom Jones, Olly Murs, and Anne Marie. Past coaches have included Jessie J, Danny O’Donoghue, Kylie Minogue, Ricky Wilson, Rita Ora, Boy George, Paloma Faith, Gavin Rossdale, Jennifer Hudson, and Meghan Trainor.

The Voice UKs discography includes 15 top 40 hit singles on the UK Singles Chart, 5 of which went Top 10 and includes only 1 UK Number 1; Gecko (Overdrive) from Series 1 Semi-Finalist Becky Hill (with Oliver Heldens). The show has also spawned five top fifty albums on the UK Albums Chart, including one top 5 single and three top 10 albums, not including singles and albums released during artists' former careers.

Singles

Albums
Only albums that charted in the Top 100 of the UK albums chart are included in this list.

See also

 Popstars (UK) discography
 Fame Academy discography
 Pop Idol discography
 The X Factor (UK) discography

References

Voice UK, The
Discography